The signature of a knot is a topological invariant in knot theory.  It may be computed from the Seifert surface.

Given a knot K in the 3-sphere, it has a Seifert surface S whose boundary is K.   The Seifert form of S is the pairing  given by taking the linking number  where  and  indicate the translates of a and b respectively in the positive and negative directions of the normal bundle to S.

The signature of the matrix , thought of as a symmetric bilinear form, is the signature of the knot K.

Slice knots are known to have zero signature.

The Alexander module formulation
Knot signatures can also be defined in terms of the Alexander module of the knot complement. Let  be the universal abelian cover of the knot complement. Consider the Alexander module to be the first homology group of the universal abelian cover of the knot complement: . Given a -module , let  denote the -module whose underlying -module is  but where  acts by the inverse covering transformation. Let  be any linear function which is invariant under the involution , then composing it with the sesquilinear duality pairing gives a symmetric bilinear form on  whose signature is an invariant of the knot.

All such signatures are concordance invariants, so all signatures of slice knots are zero. Cherry Kearton has shown how to compute the Milnor signature invariants from this pairing, which are equivalent to the Tristram-Levine invariant.

See also
Link concordance

References
 C.Gordon, Some aspects of classical knot theory. Springer Lecture Notes in Mathematics 685.  Proceedings Plans-sur-Bex Switzerland 1977.
 J.Hillman, Algebraic invariants of links. Series on Knots and everything. Vol 32. World Scientific.
 C.Kearton, Signatures of knots and the free differential calculus, Quart. J. Math. Oxford (2), 30 (1979).
 J.Levine, Knot cobordism groups in codimension two, Comment. Math. Helv. 44, 229-244 (1969)
 J.Milnor, Infinite cyclic coverings, J.G. Hocking, ed. Conf. on the Topology of Manifolds, Prindle, Weber and Schmidt, Boston, Mass, 1968 pp. 115–133.
 K.Murasugi, On a certain numerical invariant of link types, Trans. Amer. Math. Soc. 117, 387-482 (1965)
 A.Ranicki On signatures of knots Slides of lecture given in Durham on 20 June 2010.
 H.Trotter, Homology of group systems with applications to knot theory, Ann. of Math. (2) 76, 464-498 (1962)

Knot invariants